Ramer, also known as Athens, is an unincorporated community located in Montgomery County, Alabama, United States.

History
Ramer was originally known as Athens. When the town applied for a post office, Athens was already in use by a city in Alabama. Instead, the community became known as Ramer, which is the name of a nearby creek. A post office opened under the name Ramer in 1851.

Notable people
Joe Caffie, former outfielder for the Cleveland Indians
Oscar Gamble, former Major League Baseball outfielder and designated hitter

References

Unincorporated communities in Alabama
Unincorporated communities in Montgomery County, Alabama